The Wager is a 2007 Christian drama film, directed by Judson Pearce Morgan and starring Randy Travis, Jude Ciccolella and Candace Cameron Bure. It was based on the novel The Wager by Bill Myers. Billy DaMota did casting for the film.

Synopsis 
Michael Steele (Randy Travis) is an actor at the pinnacle of his Hollywood career. In the wake of being nominated for Best Actor at the Academy Awards, he is cast in what might be the role of his lifetime in an incredible story of monumental conflict. Will all the gossip swirling around him cause him to stumble on the path of righteousness? His marriage is in jeopardy and his career is on the line. He has always tried to do the right thing; now he must find the courage and conviction needed to straighten out his life.

Cast 
 Randy Travis as Michael Steele
 Jude Ciccolella as Kenny
 Nancy Stafford as Annie Steele
 Nancy Valen as Tanya Steele
 Kelly Overton as Tessa
 Bronson Pinchot as Colin Buchanan
 Candace Cameron Bure as Cassandra
 Doug Jones as Peter Barrett

Release 
The Wager was released theatrically on June 27, 2007. It was released to churches by Outreach Cinema, a Christian group that organizes showings of faith-based film at churches nationwide. Christian distribution company Pure Flix Entertainment released the film to DVD on May 13. The Wager was one of 14 Christian films featured at the 2008 Gideon Media Arts Conference and Film Festival.

Reception 
Brett McCracken of Christianity Today gave the film 1/2 out of 4 stars, writing, "Quite simply, and across the board, The Wager is not a good film. But as a "Christian" film, with its low budget and artistic limitations, it at least gives a good try..." Movieguide Magazine wrote, "The Wager is produced well. The camerawork, the editing, and the direction capture your attention... The script loses its focus two or three times and could have been fixed ahead of time... Overall, however, the movie works very well and the filmmakers should be commended."

References

External links 
 
 
 The Wager at Allmovie
 

2007 films
Films about evangelicalism
Pure Flix Entertainment films
Films produced by Russell Wolfe
Films produced by David A. R. White
Films based on American novels
Films about actors
2000s English-language films